Pyramidula pusilla is a species of very small air-breathing land snail, a terrestrial pulmonate gastropod mollusk or micromollusk in the family Pyramidulidae.

Shell description 
The width of the shell is up to 2.95 mm, the height is up to 2.25 mm. The shell has a low conical shape, broader than high. It is and tightly coiled. The apical whorls regularly increase. The umbilicus is 1/4 of the diameter (in some Spain localities 1/3). The growth lines are fine and narrow, sometimes weak. The colour is red brown becoming more grey with age.

Distribution 
The geographical distribution of this species is mainly Mediterranean: western and central Europe, southeastern Europe, Caucasus, Central Asia and probably the Russian Far East.

Europe (not a complete list):
 Great Britain
 Ireland
 Spain
 Portugal
 France - in Pyrenees
 Belgium
 Luxembourg
 Liechtenstein
 Germany
 Austria
 Hungary
 Bulgaria
 Czech Republic
 Slovakia
 Poland
 Ukraine - in Carpathians, Podolian Upland and Crimean Mountains

Southwestern Asia (not a complete list):
 Russia - in Caucasus
 Georgia
 Armenia
 Azerbaijan
 Israel

Central Asia:
 Kazakhstan
 Uzbekistan
 Turkmenistan
 Tajikistan

References

External links 
Pyramidula pusilla at AnimalBase
 Montagu, G. (1803). Testacea Britannica or natural history of British shells, marine, land, and fresh-water, including the most minute: Systematically arranged and embellished with figures. J. White, London, Vol. 1, xxxvii + 291 pp;; Vol. 2, pp. 293–606, pl. 1-16
 Vallot J.N. (1801). École Centrale du département de la Côte d'Or. Exercice sur l'histoire naturelle. 8 pp. Dijon: Frantin
 Schileyko, A. A. & Rymzhanov, T. S. (2013). Fauna of land mollusks (Gastropoda, Pulmonata Terrestria) of Kazakhstan and adjacent territories. Moscow-Almaty: KMK Scientific Press. 389 pp

Pyramidulidae
Gastropods described in 1801